Below is the list of populated places in Tekirdağ Province, Turkey by the districts. In the following lists first place in each list is the administrative center of the district.

Süleymanpaşa
	Süleymanpaşa
	Ahmedikli, Süleymanpaşa
	Ahmetçe, Süleymanpaşa
	Akçahalil, Süleymanpaşa
	Araphacı, Süleymanpaşa
	Aşağıkılıçlı, Süleymanpaşa
	Avşar, Süleymanpaşa
	Banarlı, Süleymanpaşa
	Barbaros, Süleymanpaşa
	Bıyıkali, Süleymanpaşa
	Çanakçı, Süleymanpaşa
	Dedecik, Süleymanpaşa
	Demirli, Süleymanpaşa
	Doğrukaracamurat, Süleymanpaşa
	Evciler, Süleymanpaşa
	Ferhadanlı, Süleymanpaşa
	Gazioğlu, Süleymanpaşa
	Generli, Süleymanpaşa
	Gündüzlü, Süleymanpaşa
	Güveçli, Süleymanpaşa
	Hacıköy, Süleymanpaşa
	Husunlu, Süleymanpaşa
	Işıklar, Süleymanpaşa
	İnecik, Süleymanpaşa
	Karabezirgan, Süleymanpaşa
	Karacakılavuz, Süleymanpaşa
	Karaçalı, Süleymanpaşa
	Karaevli, Süleymanpaşa
	Karahalil, Süleymanpaşa
	Karahisarlı, Süleymanpaşa
	Karansıllı, Süleymanpaşa
	Kaşıkçı, Süleymanpaşa
	Kayı, Süleymanpaşa
	Kazandere, Süleymanpaşa
	Kılavuzlu, Süleymanpaşa
	Kınıklar, Süleymanpaşa
	Köseilyas, Süleymanpaşa
	Kumbağ, Süleymanpaşa
	Mahramlı, Süleymanpaşa
	Naipköy, Süleymanpaşa
	Nusratfakı, Süleymanpaşa
	Nusratlı, Süleymanpaşa
	Oğuzlu, Süleymanpaşa
	Ormanlı, Süleymanpaşa
	Ortaca, Süleymanpaşa
	Oruçbeyli, Süleymanpaşa
	Osmanlı, Süleymanpaşa
	Otmanlı, Süleymanpaşa
	Selçuk, Süleymanpaşa
	Semetli, Süleymanpaşa
	Seymenli, Süleymanpaşa
	Taşumurca, Süleymanpaşa
	Tatarlı, Süleymanpaşa
	Yağcı, Süleymanpaşa
	Yayabaşı, Süleymanpaşa
	Yazır, Süleymanpaşa
	Yenice, Süleymanpaşa
	Yeniköy, Süleymanpaşa
	Yukarıkılıçlı, Süleymanpaşa
	Yuva, Süleymanpaşa

Çerkezköy
       Çerkezköy
       Kızılpınar, Çerkezköy
       Veliköy, Çerkezköy

Çorlu
	Çorlu
	Ahimehmet, Çorlu
	Bakırca, Çorlu
	Deregündüzlü, Çorlu
	Esenler, Çorlu
	İğneler, Çorlu
	Karamehmet, Çorlu
	Kırkgöz, Çorlu
	Maksutlu, Çorlu
	Marmaracık, Çorlu
	Misinli, Çorlu
	Önerler, Çorlu
	Paşaköy, Çorlu
	Pınarbaşı, Çorlu
	Sarılar, Çorlu
	Seymen, Çorlu
	Şahpaz, Çorlu
	Türkgücü, Çorlu
	Ulaş, Çorlu
	Vakıflar, Çorlu
	Velimeşe, Çorlu
	Yenice, Çorlu
	Yulaflı, Çorlu

Ergene
	Ergene

Hayrabolu
	Hayrabolu
	Ataköy, Hayrabolu
	Avluobası, Hayrabolu
	Aydınlar, Hayrabolu
	Bayramşah, Hayrabolu
	Buzağcı, Hayrabolu
	Büyükkarakarlı, Hayrabolu
	Cambazdere, Hayrabolu
	Canhıdır, Hayrabolu
	Çene, Hayrabolu
	Çerkezmüsellim, Hayrabolu
	Çıkrıkçı, Hayrabolu
	Dambaslar, Hayrabolu
	Danişment, Hayrabolu
	Delibedir, Hayrabolu
	Duğcalı, Hayrabolu
	Emiryakup, Hayrabolu
	Fahrioğlu, Hayrabolu
	Hacıllı, Hayrabolu
	Hasköy, Hayrabolu
	Hedeyli, Hayrabolu
	İsmailli, Hayrabolu
	Kabahöyük, Hayrabolu
	Kadriye, Hayrabolu
	Kandamış, Hayrabolu
	Karababa, Hayrabolu
	Karabürçek, Hayrabolu
	Karakavak, Hayrabolu
	Karayahşi, Hayrabolu
	Kemallar, Hayrabolu
	Kılıçlar, Hayrabolu
	Kurtdere, Hayrabolu
	Kutlugün, Hayrabolu
	Küçükkarakarlı, Hayrabolu
	Lahna, Hayrabolu
	Muzruplu, Hayrabolu
	Örey, Hayrabolu
	Övenler, Hayrabolu
	Parmaksız, Hayrabolu
	Soylu, Hayrabolu
	Subaşı, Hayrabolu
	Susuzmüsellim, Hayrabolu
	Şalgamlı, Hayrabolu
	Tatarlı, Hayrabolu
	Temrezli, Hayrabolu
	Umurbey, Hayrabolu
	Umurçu, Hayrabolu
	Yörgüç, Hayrabolu
	Yörükler, Hayrabolu

Kapaklı
       Kapaklı
       Bahçeağıl, Kapaklı
       Karaağaç, Kapaklı
       Karlı, Kapaklı
       Pınarca, Kapaklı
       Uzunhacı, Kapaklı
       Yanıkağıl, Kapaklı

Malkara
	Malkara		
	Ahievren, Malkara		
	Ahmetpaşa, Malkara		
	Aksakal, Malkara		
	Alaybey, Malkara		
	Allıışık, Malkara		
	Bağpınarı, Malkara		
	Balabancık, Malkara		
	Ballı, Malkara		
	Ballısüle, Malkara		
	Batkın, Malkara		
	Bayramtepe, Malkara		
	Çavuşköy, Malkara		
	Çınaraltı, Malkara		
	Çınarlıdere, Malkara		
	Çimendere, Malkara		
	Danişment, Malkara		
	Davuteli, Malkara		
	Deliller, Malkara		
	Demircili, Malkara		
	Dereköy, Malkara		
	Deveci, Malkara		
	Develi, Malkara		
	Doğanköy, Malkara		
	Dolu, Malkara		
	Elmalı, Malkara		
	Emirali, Malkara		
	Esendik, Malkara		
	Evrenbey, Malkara		
	Gönence, Malkara		
	Gözsüz, Malkara		
	Güneşli, Malkara		
	Hacısungur, Malkara		
	Halıç, Malkara		
	Hasköy, Malkara		
	Hemit, Malkara		
	Hereke, Malkara		
	Izgar, Malkara		
	İbribey, Malkara		
	İbrice, Malkara		
	İshakça, Malkara		
	Kadıköy, Malkara		
	Kalaycı, Malkara		
	Karacagür, Malkara		
	Karacahalil, Malkara		
	Karaiğdemir, Malkara		
	Karamurat, Malkara		
	Kavakçeşme, Malkara		
	Kermeyan, Malkara		
	Kırıkali, Malkara		
	Kiremitlik, Malkara		
	Kozyörük, Malkara		
	Kuyucu, Malkara		
	Küçükhıdır, Malkara		
	Kürtüllü, Malkara		
	Mestanlar, Malkara		
	Müstecep, Malkara		
	Pirinççeşme, Malkara		
	Sağlamtaş, Malkara		
	Sarıpolat, Malkara		
	Sarıyar, Malkara		
	Sarnıç, Malkara		
	Sırtbey, Malkara		
	Şahin, Malkara		
	Tekkeköy, Malkara		
	Teteköy, Malkara		
	Vakıfiğdemir, Malkara		
	Yaylagöne, Malkara		
	Yaylaköy, Malkara		
	Yenice, Malkara		
	Yenidibek, Malkara		
	Yılanlı, Malkara		
	Yörücek, Malkara		
	Yürük, Malkara

Marmaraereğlisi
	Marmara Ereğlisi
	Çeşmeli, Marmaraereğlisi
	Sultanköy, Marmaraereğlisi
	Türkmenli, Marmaraereğlisi
	Yakuplu, Marmaraereğlisi
	Yeniçiftlik, Marmaraereğlisi

Muratlı
	Muratlı		
	Arzulu, Muratlı		
	Aşağısevindikli, Muratlı		
	Aydınköy, Muratlı		
	Balabanlı, Muratlı		
	Ballıhoca, Muratlı		
	Çevrimkaya, Muratlı		
	Hanoğlu, Muratlı		
	İnanlı, Muratlı		
	Kepenekli, Muratlı		
	Kırkkepenekli, Muratlı		
	Müsellim, Muratlı		
	Yavaşça, Muratlı		
	Yeşilsırt, Muratlı		
	Yukarısevindikli, Muratlı		
	Yukarısırt, Muratlı		
	Yurtbekler, Muratlı

Saray
	Saray	
	Ayvacık, Saray	
	Bahçedere, Saray	
	Bahçeköy, Saray	
	Beyazköy, Saray	
	Büyükyoncalı, Saray	
	Çayla, Saray	
	Çukuryurt, Saray	
	Demirler, Saray	
	Edirköy, Saray	
	Göçerler, Saray	
	Güngörmez, Saray	
	Kadıköy, Saray	
	Karabürçek, Saray	
	Kavacık, Saray	
	Kurtdere, Saray	
	Küçükyoncalı, Saray	
	Osmanlı, Saray	
	Sefaalan, Saray	
	Sinanlı, Saray	
	Sofular, Saray	
	Yuvalı, Saray

Şarköy
	Şarköy
	Aşağıkalamış, Şarköy		
	Beyoğlu, Şarköy		
	Bulgur, Şarköy		
	Çengelli, Şarköy		
	Çınarlı, Şarköy		
	Eriklice, Şarköy		
	Gaziköy, Şarköy		
	Gölcük, Şarköy		
	Güzelköy, Şarköy		
	Hoşköy, Şarköy		
	İğdebağları, Şarköy		
	İshaklı, Şarköy		
	Kızılcaterzi, Şarköy		
	Kirazlı, Şarköy		
	Kocaali, Şarköy		
	Mursallı, Şarköy		
	Mürefte, Şarköy		
	Palamut, Şarköy		
	Sofuköy, Şarköy		
	Şenköy, Şarköy		
	Tepeköy, Şarköy		
	Uçmakdere, Şarköy		
	Ulaman, Şarköy		
	Yayaağaç, Şarköy		
	Yayaköy, Şarköy		
	Yeniköy, Şarköy		
	Yörgüç, Şarköy		
	Yukarıkalamış, Şarköy

Recent development

According to Law act no 6360, all Turkish provinces with a population more than 750 000, were renamed as metropolitan municipality. Furthermore, two new disreicts were established; Kapaklı and Ergene. All districts in those provinces became second level municipalities and all villages in those districts  were renamed as a neighborhoods . Thus the villages listed above are officially neighborhoods of Tekirdağ.

References

Tekirdag
List